The Australian Kelpie, or simply Kelpie, is an Australian sheepdog capable of mustering and droving with little or no guidance. It is a medium-sized dog and comes in a variety of colours. The Kelpie has been exported throughout the world and is used to muster livestock, primarily sheep, cattle and goats.

The breed has been separated into two distinct varieties: the Show (or Bench) Kelpie and the Working Kelpie. The Show Kelpie is seen at conformation dog shows in some countries and is selected for appearance rather than working instinct, while the Working Kelpie is bred for working ability rather than appearance.

History

The ancestors of most Kelpies were British dogs known loosely as collies (sometimes spelled colleys). These were mostly black, or very dark brown, dogs – hence the name collie, which has the same root as coal. (The official collie breeds were not formed until about 10 or 15 years after the Kelpie was established as a breed, and the first recognised Border Collie was not brought to Australia until after the Federation in 1901). Some collies were imported to Australia for stock work in the early 19th century, and were bred with other types of dogs – usually with an eye to working sheep without direct supervision.

For much of the 20th century and early 21st century it was claimed that kelpies were partly descended from dingoes. In 2019, it was widely reported that a genomic study conducted by researchers from the University of Sydney indicated that the kelpie had no dingo ancestry although this is still uncertain. Claire Wade, co-author of the study's paper, informed Bill Robinson (author of Origins of the Australian Kelpie) that she has never suggested there was "no dingo blood in the Kelpie breed" as the media reported. Wade explained: 

The first dog known as a Kelpie was a black and tan female pup with floppy ears bought by Jack Gleeson about 1872 from a litter born on Warrock Station near Casterton, owned by George Robertson, a Scot. This dog was named Kelpie after the kelpie, a mythological shapeshifting water spirit of Celtic folklore. In later years she was referred to as "(Gleeson's) Kelpie", to differentiate her from "(King's) Kelpie", her daughter.

The second "Kelpie" was "(King's) Kelpie", another black and tan bitch out of "Kelpie" by "Caesar", a pup from two sheepdogs imported from Scotland. "(King's) Kelpie" tied for the prestigious Forbes Trial in 1879, and the strain was soon popularly referred to as "Kelpie's pups", or just Kelpies. The King brothers joined another breeder, McLeod, to form a dog breeding partnership whose dogs dominated trials during 1900 to 1920.

An early Kelpie, Sally, was mated to Moss, a Smooth Collie, and she produced a black pup that was named Barb after The Barb, a black horse which had won the Melbourne Cup in 1866. Consequently, black Kelpies became known as Barb Kelpies or Barbs.

There were a number of Kelpies named Red Cloud. The first and most famous was John Quinn's Red Cloud in the early 20th century. In the 1960s, another Red Cloud became well known in Western Australia. This started the tradition in Western Australia of calling all Red or Red and Tan Kelpies, especially those with white chests, Red Cloud Kelpies. Other notable specimens include Gunner and Red Dog (c. 1971 – 21 November 1979), a Kelpie mix which was the subject of a movie, Red Dog, released in 2011.

Kelpies have been exported to many countries including Argentina, Canada, Italy, Korea, New Caledonia, New Zealand, Sweden, the United Kingdom and the United States for various pursuits.

By 1990, Kelpies had been trained as scent dogs with good success rates. In Sweden they have been widely used for tracking and rescue work.

Appearance

The Kelpie is a soft-coated, medium-sized dog, usually with prick ears and an athletic appearance. Their coat  colours include black, black and tan, red, red and tan, blue, blue and tan, 
fawn, fawn and tan, cream, black and blue, and white and gold. The Kelpie generally weighs  and measures  at the withers.

Breed standards 
Robert Kaleski published the first standard for the Kelpie in 1904. The standard was accepted by leading breeders of the time and adopted by the Kennel Club of New South Wales. Contemporary breed standards vary depending on whether the registry is for working or show Kelpies. It is possible for a dog to both work and show, but options for competition in conformation shows might be limited depending on ancestry and the opinions of the kennel clubs or breed clubs involved.

In Australia, there are two separate registries for Kelpies. Working Kelpies are registered with the Working Kelpie Council (WKC) and/or the Australian Sheepdog Workers Association. The WKC encourages breeding for working ability, and allows a wide variety of coat colours. Show Kelpies are registered with the Australian National Kennel Council, which encourages breeding for a certain appearance and limits acceptable colours. The wide standards allowed by the WKC mean that Working Kelpies do not meet the standard for showing.

In the US, the Kelpie is not recognised as a breed by the American Kennel Club (AKC). However, the United Kennel Club and the Canadian Kennel Club recognise the Kelpie and allow them to compete in official events. As of 2015, Australian Kelpies have been accepted by the AKC as Herding Dogs allowed to compete in AKC sanctioned Sheep Herding Trials.

Working Kelpie 

The Working Kelpie comes in three coat types: short, smooth and rough. The coat can be almost any colour from black to light tan or cream. Some Kelpies have a white blaze on the chest, and a few have white points. Kelpies sometimes have a double coat, which sheds out in spring in temperate climates. Agouti is not unusual, and can look like a double coat.

The dog's working ability is unrelated to appearance, so stockmen looking for capable working dogs disregard the dog's appearance.

A Working Kelpie can be a cheap and efficient worker that can save farmers and graziers the cost of several hands when mustering livestock.  The good working Kelpies are herding dogs that will prevent stock from moving away from the stockman. This natural instinct is crucial when mustering stock in isolated gorge country, where a good dog will silently move ahead of the stockman and block up the stock (usually cattle) until the rider appears. The preferred dogs for cattle work are Kelpies, often of a special line, or a Kelpie cross. They will drive a mob of livestock long distances in extremes of climates and conditions. Kelpies have natural instincts for managing livestock. They will work sheep, cattle, goats, pigs, poultry, and other domestic livestock. The Kelpie's signature move is to jump on the backs of sheep and walk across the tops of the sheep to reach the other side and break up the jam. A good working Kelpie is a versatile dog – they can work all day on the farm, ranch, or station, and trial on the weekends. Kelpies compete and are exhibited in livestock working trials, ranging from yards or arenas to large open fields working sheep, goats, cattle, or ducks.

Show Kelpie
Kelpies that are bred under the ANKC registrations are registered for show (Main Register) only in the following colours: Black, Chocolate, Red, Smoky Blue, Fawn, Black and Tan and Red and Tan. They have a double coat and pricked ears. The other colours can be registered as pets and sporting dogs (Limited Register): Blue and Tan, Fawn and Tan and Yellow/Cream.  It was during the early 20th century that Kelpies were first exhibited, at the Sydney Royal Easter Show. Different kennel clubs' Show Kelpies are generally a little heavier in build and not as tall as Working Kelpies. ANKC "Show" Kelpies are now becoming very popular both nationally and internationally as family pets, companion dogs, running mates and sport dogs due to their trainability, good nature and low maintenance of care and can be found all over the world.

Temperament

Show Kelpies generally excel in agility trials and may be shown in conformation in Australia.

Kelpies are intelligent and easy to train dogs making them good-tempered and good pets, especially with children. However they require a lot of physical exercise and mental stimulation, otherwise, they can become bored and hence be disruptive by constantly barking or digging, or by chewing on objects. Taking them on medium to long walks or playing fetch are good ways to keep them stimulated.

Health
Kelpies are a hardy breed with few health problems, but they are susceptible to disorders common to all breeds, such as cryptorchidism, hip dysplasia, cerebellar abiotrophy and luxating patella. Research is underway to find the genetic marker for cerebellar abiotrophy in the breed. 

They tend to live to around 10–12 years although some injure themselves as by the age of 10 or 11 they become weaker. Until she died at her home in Woolsthorpe, Victoria in April 2016, aged 30 years (about 150 'dog years'), Maggie (a Kelpie), was thought to be the world's oldest dog at her time of death.

Show coat colours

See also
 Dogs portal
 List of dog breeds
 Australian Cattle Dog
 Australian Shepherd
 Australian Stumpy Tail Cattle Dog
 Koolie
 Sheep husbandry
 Working Group (dogs)

Notes

References

Further reading

External links 

 Working Kelpie Council
 North American Australian Kelpie Registry
 Kelpie coat colour genetics

FCI breeds
Herding dogs
Dog breeds originating in Australia